"Yes, and...", also referred to as "Yes, and..." thinking, is a rule-of-thumb in improvisational comedy that suggests that an improviser should accept what another improviser has stated ("yes") and then expand on that line of thinking ("and"). The improvisers' characters may still disagree. It is also used in business and other organizations as a principle that improves the effectiveness of the brainstorming process, fosters effective communication, and encourages the free sharing of ideas.

Principles

The "Yes" portion of the rule encourages the acceptance of the contributions added by others. Participants in an improvisation are encouraged to agree to proposition, fostering a sense of cooperation  rather than shutting down the suggestion and effectively ending the line of communication.

In an organizational setting, saying "Yes" in theory encourages people to listen and be receptive to the ideas of others. Rather than immediately judging the idea, as judgment has its place later on in the development process, one should initially accept the idea, which enables the discussion to expand on the idea without limitations.   The next step in the process is to add new information into the narrative.  The concept of "and" is to sway away from directly changing the suggested material, "and" rather building upon it.

References

Improvisational theatre
Rules of thumb